Dock Work Convention, 1973 is  an International Labour Organization Convention.

It was established in 1973:
Considering that important changes have taken place and are taking place in cargo-handling methods in docks—such as the adoption of unit loads, the introduction of roll-on roll-off techniques and the increase of mechanisation and automation—and in the pattern of movement of freight, and that such changes are expected to become more widespread in the future,...

Ratifications
As of January 2023, the convention has been ratified by 25 states, with the most recent ratification being completed by the Russian Federation in 2004. One of the ratifying states, the Netherlands, has denounced the treaty.

External links 
Text.
Ratifications.

International Labour Organization conventions
Treaties concluded in 1973
Treaties entered into force in 1975
Treaties of the Democratic Republic of Afghanistan
Treaties of Australia
Treaties of Brazil
Treaties of Costa Rica
Treaties of Cuba
Treaties of Egypt
Treaties of Finland
Treaties of France
Treaties of Guyana
Treaties of Ba'athist Iraq
Treaties of Italy
Treaties of Kenya
Treaties of Mauritius
Treaties of Nicaragua
Treaties of Nigeria
Treaties of Norway
Treaties of the Polish People's Republic
Treaties of Portugal
Treaties of the Socialist Republic of Romania
Treaties of Russia
Treaties of Francoist Spain
Treaties of Sweden
Treaties of Tanzania
Treaties of Uruguay
Admiralty law treaties
1973 in labor relations